Henry Holmes ( – 23 June 1738) of Thorley, Yarmouth, Isle of Wight, was an Anglo-Irish Army officer, landowner and Tory politician who was Lieutenant-Governor of the Isle of Wight (1710–14) and sat in the English and British House of Commons from 1695 to 1717.

Early life

Holmes was the son of Thomas Holmes of Kilmallock, co. Limerick and joined the Army. He was appointed Captain of Hurst Castle on the Isle of Wight in 1683.

Military career
In March 1687 he was a Lieutenant in a company of Grenadiers, and in November 1687 became Lieutenant in the 8th Foot. He was a Captain in 1689 and Major in 1692. In 1692, his uncle, Sir Robert Holmes of Thorley, left him his estates, provided he married Sir Robert's illegitimate daughter, Mary. Holmes married this Mary Holmes within 18 months and left the army.

Political career
In 1695, Holmes lost the governorship of Hurst Castle after opposing the Governor of the Isle of Wight, Lord Cutts. However, he was returned as Member of Parliament for Yarmouth (Isle of Wight) on his own interest at a by election on 2 April 1695 and followed up being returned in a contest at the 1695 English general election. His dispute with Lord Cutts continued in the House of Commons, as he accused Cutts of discharging militia officers in Yarmouth who had voted against Holmes' rival, Cutts' brother-in-law John Acton. He refused to sign the Association, and in March 1696 voted against fixing the price of guineas at 22 shillings. In 1697, the House had to intervene to prevent a duel between Holmes and Lord Cutts. At the 1698 English general election, with the dispute with Cutts resolved, Holmes was returned  unopposed as MP for Yarmouth. He was returned unopposed at the two general elections of 1701 as a Tory.

In 1702, Holmes was restored to his post as Governor of Hurst Castle, and he was returned unopposed again at the 1702 English general election. He was relatively inactive, but  voted for the Tack on 28 November 1704. At the 1705 English general election, he was returned unopposed again and voted against the Court candidate for Speaker on 25 October 1705. He was returned as a Tory at the 1708 British general election and voted against the impeachment of Dr Sacheverell in 1710. At the 1710 British general election, he was returned again for Yarmouth as a Tory, and with the change of Administration was appointed Lieutenant-Governor of the Isle of Wight in 1710. He was listed as a 'worthy patriot' who helped detect the mismanagements of the previous ministry in 1711. He was returned again as a Tory at the 1713 British general election but lost his post as  Lieutenant-Governor on the Hanoverian succession. He was returned at a contest at the 1715 British general election, and voted against the septennial bill in 1716, but was unseated on petition on 12 April 1717.

Death and legacy
Holmes died on 23 June 1738, having had, with his wife, eight sons and eight daughters. His sons Thomas, Henry, and Charles all sat in Parliament for Isle of Wight constituencies.

Genealogy

 Henry Holmes of Mallow, Cork, Ireland
 Colonel Thomas Holmes of Kilmallock, Limerick, Ireland
 Henry Holmes (–1738) m. Mary Holmes (daughter of Admiral Sir Robert Holmes)
  Thomas Holmes, 1st Baron Holmes (1699–1764)
 Lieutenant General Henry Holmes (1703–62)
 Rear Admiral Charles Holmes (1711–1761)
 Elizabeth Holmes m. Thomas Troughear
 Leonard (Troughear) Holmes, 1st Baron Holmes (–1804) m. Elizabeth Tyrrell (d.1810)
 The Hon. Elizabeth Holmes m. Edward Rushout
 Descendants
 Admiral Sir Robert Holmes (–1692), English Admiral
 Mary Holmes (wife of Henry Holmes)
 Admiral Sir John Holmes (1640?–1683), English Admiral leader

References

 

1660s births
1738 deaths
Year of birth uncertain
People from Yarmouth, Isle of Wight
Members of the Parliament of Great Britain for English constituencies
English MPs 1695–1698
English MPs 1698–1700
English MPs 1701
English MPs 1701–1702
English MPs 1702–1705
English MPs 1705–1707
British MPs 1707–1708
British MPs 1708–1710
British MPs 1710–1713
British MPs 1713–1715
British MPs 1715–1722
Place of birth missing